The Moggs are an indie rock band from the San Francisco Bay Area of the United States comprising Justin Millar (aka Sir Plus) and Cara LP (aka Miss Minor).

History
The duo met while auditioning for a Calvin Klein underwear commercial in 1995. Sir Plus plays guitar and Miss Minor plays drums, both contributing vocals.

The band's album The White Belt Is Not Enough was recorded at a Victorian house in Petaluma on vintage analog equipment and mastered at Abbey Road Studios, and released in 2005 to positive reviews, with a US tour following.

The band's music has been described as indie rock and "garagey and primal and minimalist". Comparisons have been drawn with Sonic Youth, Polvo, Blonde Redhead, and Erase Errata.

Discography

Albums
 The White Belt is Not Enough (2005), Ausgang/Absolutely Kosher

EPs
 Amulat EP (2008), Ausgang

Singles
 "Evening Shadows" (2010), Pandacide - split with Santiago

References

External links
 

Indie rock musical groups from California
Musical groups from the San Francisco Bay Area